Faultless (foaled 1944 in Kentucky) was an American Thoroughbred racehorse best known for winning the 1947 Preakness Stakes.

Background
He was bred and raced by Calumet Farm. His dam, Unerring, was the 1939 American Co-Champion Three-Year-Old Filly. His sire was Calumet's preeminent stallion Bull Lea, who was the sire of seven U.S. Racing Hall of Fame inductees. He was trained by the father/son team of Ben and Jimmy Jones, Faultless was ridden in most of his races by Douglas Dodson.

Racing career
At age two, Faultless did not win a major stakes race, but at age three, he won three important races leading up to the 1947 U.S. Triple Crown series. Despite this, in the Kentucky Derby he was sent off as the fifth choice by bettors behind heavily favored Phalanx. Faultless ran third in the Derby behind Phalanx and winner Jet Pilot. In the ensuing Preakness Stakes, Dodson guided the colt to a win over Jet Pilot, who finished fourth, and Phalanx, who finished third. In the Belmont Stakes, Phalanx bounced back to win the race with Faultless finishing fifth.

Faultless continued racing through age five, then entered stud in 1950. His offspring met with modest racing success.

Pedigree

References
 Faultless's pedigree and partial racing stats

1944 racehorse births
Racehorses bred in Kentucky
Racehorses trained in the United States
Preakness Stakes winners
Thoroughbred family 4-m